Laid Low is the second extended play from Everything in Slow Motion. Facedown Records released the EP on April 22, 2016.

Critical reception

David Craft states, "While every song on Laid Low is very good, things somehow never quite come together in a cohesive manner. This EP more or less seems to be a random collection of experimental songs rather than a consolidated project. Regardless, the album's softer elements in no way detract from Laid Lows excellence, instead revealing EISM's potential to break into other genres should they continue on this path."

HMMagazine gave a positive review, stating "Laid Low serves as an abbreviated illustration of the band’s various compelling modes", with the primary negative being the absence of a single headliner song of as high a quality as their past work.

Track listing

Personnel
EISM
 Shane Oschner – vocals, guitars, bass

Guest musician
 Miles McPherson – drums (ex-Paramore, ex-MATSOD)

Production
 Josh Barber – producer
 Dave Quiggle – artwork

Chart performance

References

2016 EPs
Facedown Records albums